St Andrew's Academy may refer to:

St Andrew's Academy, North Ayrshire, school in Saltcoats, Scotland from 1971 to 2007, replaced by St Matthew's Academy
St Andrew's Academy, Paisley, school in Renfrewshire, Scotland since 1990

See also
St. Andrew's School (disambiguation)